HM Prison Long Lartin is a Category A men's prison, located in the village of South Littleton (near Evesham) in the Wychavon district in Worcestershire, England. It is operated by His Majesty's Prison Service.

History
Long Lartin was opened as a Category C training prison in 1971, with additional security features and systems being added in 1972 to enable it to operate as a dispersal prison.

In April 1990, inmates at Long Lartin Prison attempted a mass breakout, and about 30 prisoners barricaded themselves on a landing after officers foiled their escape bid. As a consequence of this and other security breaches, such as when inmate Gareth Connett was suspected of making a homemade handgun in the metal workshop in August 1992 which resulted in a full stand down search of Long Lartin, prison officers were drafted in from all around the country and many homemade weapons were found that had been manufactured in the metal workshop. The establishment was further upgraded between 1995–97 to a maximum security prison.

In August 1998, the then Governor of Long Lartin, Jim Mullen claimed that mentally ill inmates at the prison faced unacceptable delays before being transferred to appropriate hospital accommodation. Mullen stated that up to 20 of his 379 inmates should have been in secure hospital accommodation, after a report by the Chief Inspector of Prisons called for action to speed up the movement of prisoners in need of specialist care.

A supermax segregation unit (the biggest in Europe) a new residential wing called Perrie Wing was opened at Long Lartin in June 1999, designed to hold the most violent and dangerous types of offenders. The new wing substantially increased the capacity of Long Lartin Prison.

A November 2003 inspection report from Her Majesty's Chief Inspector of Prisons stated that Long Lartin Prison was generally safe for inmates and offered good staff-prisoner relations and reoffending work. However the report also cited serious deficiencies at the prison in areas such as race relations, the overloaded and understaffed drug treatment team, and too many prisoners being locked up instead of in work.

On the evening of 11 October 2017, during a disturbance on E wing, staff had to retreat. Ten Tornado teams, prison officers equipped and trained to deal with riots, resolved the disorder.  At the time two-thirds of inmates were serving life sentences, and in common with other prisons Long Lartin had had staffing cuts of about 20%.

The prison today
 Long Lartin is a 622 capacity Category A prisoner jail.

There are eight main residential units at the prison for sentenced inmates. Two other residential units were demolished and the construction of a replacement purpose built two wing 180 house block has been now been completed. There have been two murders at the prison since 2014. 

In October 2017, riot officers were needed over a serious disturbance when 81 prisoners attacked staff with pool balls and forced them to retreat. In January 2018, inspectors considered the prison stable and well controlled. In June 2018 there was a report that the prison's governor needed hospital treatment and spent weeks off work after a prisoner had attacked her. On 30 September 2018 a disturbance broke out and six prison officers were injured, three had head injuries, two had suspected broken jaws and one had a fractured arm according to the Prison Officers' Association. The disorder ended at around 17:30, seven prisoners were put into isolation and will be moved to other prisons.  In September 2019 a disturbance occurred involving ten prisoners who temporarily took over a wing. One prison officer needed hospital treatment and specialist riot-trained prison officers were sent in.

Notable inmates
Martin Evans of The Daily Telegraph described Long Lartin as one of the UK's "top security jails", and that the prisoners included "some of Britain's most notorious".

Vincent Tabak For the murder of Joanna Yeates. Tabak was sentenced to life imprisonment with a minimum term of 20 years
Ben Geen, a former nurse who since 2006 has been serving 30 years (17 concurrent life sentences) for 15 charges of grievous bodily harm and 2 of murder. He still claims to be innocent of all these crimes.
 Christopher Halliwell who was convicted of murdering two women and is believed to have murdered more.
 Nathan Matthews, sentenced to life imprisonment with a minimum term of 33 years for the Murder of Becky Watts.
Carl Dobson, grime MC who is serving a minimum of 30 years for murder.
Steve Wright, serial killer who is serving a life sentence for the murder of five women in 2006.
Jake Fahri, is serving a life sentence, serving a minimum term of 14 years for the murder of 16 year old school boy Jimmy Mizen on 10 May 2008

Former inmates
 Babar Ahmad
 Subhan Anwar (deceased)
 Jeremy Bamber
 Mark Dixie
 Abu Hamza (Mustapha Kamel Mustapha) 
 Barry Horne
 Erwin James
 Radislav Krstić (transferred to a prison in Poland)
 Ian McAteer
 Abu Qatada
 Charles Salvador
 Frank Stagg
 John Straffen
 Sidonio Teixeira, who murdered his three-year-old daughter and received a life sentence in 2008. Beaten to death at the prison in 2016.
 Ian Watkins of former rock band Lostprophets. Jailed for 29 years after pleading guilty to 13 sexual offence charges, including attempted rape of a baby. Watkins was later transferred to another prison.
 Charlie Kray, elder brother of Ronnie and Reggie Kray.
Archibald Hall, aka the "Monster Butler" or the "Killer Butler" murdered a number of his wealthy employers for whom he was working as a butler. He wrote of his time in Long Lartin prison in his book The Wicked Mr Hall - The Memoirs of the Butler who Loved to Kill.

References

External links
 Ministry of Justice pages on Long Lartin

Category A prisons in England
Prisons in Worcestershire
1971 establishments in England
Men's prisons
Dispersal prisons
Wychavon